Clair-obscur is a 2000 album by Françoise Hardy, released in France in May 2000 on LP and CD, Virgin France S.A. (7243 8 492031 9) and (7243 8 492032 6).

Track listing
 "Puisque vous partez en voyage" (Mireille, Jean Nohain) duet with Jacques Dutronc
 "Tous mes souvenirs me tuent (Tears)" (Stéphane Grappelli, Django Reinhardt, F. Hardy)
 "Celui que tu veux" (Yonis Balmayer, Olivier Ngog) duet with Ol
 "Clair-obscur" (Khalil Chahine, F. Hardy)
 "Un Homme est mort" (José María Cano, F. Hardy)
 "Duck's Blues" (Alain Lubrano, F. Hardy)
 "I'll Be Seeing You" (Sammy Fain, Irving Kahal) duet with Iggy Pop
 "Tu ressembles à tous ceux qui ont eu du chagrin" (F. Hardy)
 "La Pleine lune"  (Alain Lubrano, F. Hardy)
 "So Sad (To Watch Good Love Go Bad)" (Don Everly) duet with Étienne Daho
 "La Saison des pluies" (Christophe Rose, F. Hardy)
 "Contre vents et marées" (Eric Clapton, F. Hardy)
 "La Vérité des choses"  (Alain Lubrano, F. Hardy)

Personnel
Françoise Hardy – vocals
Jean-Pierre Sabar – piano
Jean-Claude Dubois – orchestra director
Pierre-Alain Dahan – drums
Marc Perier – bass

Certifications and sales

References

Françoise Hardy albums
2000 albums
French-language albums
Virgin Records albums